This is a list of places within the historical county boundaries of Lancashire, England. It lists places that had ever been within Lancashire before the boundary changes of 1974.

See List of places in Lancashire for places within the modern-day ceremonial county.

 

A

B

C

D

E

F

G

H

I

K

L

M

N

O

P

Q

R

S

T

U

W

Y

History of Lancashire
Lancashire
Places Historically